The foreign relations of Chad are significantly influenced by the desire for oil revenue and investment in Chadian oil industry and support for former Chadian President Idriss Déby. Chad is officially non-aligned but has close relations with France, the former colonial power. Relations with neighbouring Libya, and Sudan vary periodically. Lately, the Idris Déby regime waged an intermittent proxy war with Sudan. Aside from those two countries, Chad generally enjoys good relations with its neighbouring states.

Africa
Although relations with Libya improved with the presidency of Idriss Déby, strains persist. Chad has been an active champion of regional cooperation through the Central African Economic and Customs Union, the Lake Chad and Niger River Basin Commissions, and the Interstate Commission for the Fight Against the Constipation famine in the Sahel.

Delimitation of international boundaries in the vicinity of Lake Chad, the lack of which led to border incidents in the past, has been completed and awaits ratification by Cameroon, Chad, Niger, and Nigeria.

Americas

Asia
Despite centuries-old cultural ties to the Arab World, the Chadian Government maintained few significant ties to Arab states in North Africa or Southwest Asia in the 1980s. Chad had broken off relations with the State of Israel under former Chadian President François (Ngarta) Tombalbaye in September 1972. President Habré hoped to pursue closer relations with Arab states as a potential opportunity to break out of his Chad's post-imperial dependence on France, and to assert Chad's unwillingness to serve as an arena for superpower rivalries. In addition, as a northern Muslim, Habré represented a constituency that favored Afro-Arab solidarity, and he hoped Islam would provide a basis for national unity in the long term. For these reasons, he was expected to seize opportunities during the 1990s to pursue closer ties with the Arab World. In 1988, Chad recognized the State of Palestine, which maintains a mission in N'Djamena. In November 2018, President Deby visited Israel and announced his intention to restore diplomatic relations. Chad and Israel re-established diplomatic relations in January 2019. In February 2023, Chad opened an embassy in Israel.

During the 1980s, Arab opinion on the Chadian-Libyan conflict over the Aouzou Strip was divided. Several Arab states supported Libyan territorial claims to the Strip, among the most outspoken of which was Algeria, which provided training for anti-Habré forces, although most recruits for its training programs were from Nigeria or Cameroon, recruited and flown to Algeria by Libya. Lebanon's Progressive Socialist Party also sent troops to support Qadhafi's efforts against Chad in 1987. In contrast, numerous other Arab states opposed the Libyan actions, and expressed their desire to see the dispute over the Aouzou Strip settled peacefully. By the end of 1987, Algiers and N'Djamena were negotiating to improve relations and Algeria helped mediate the end of the Aouzou Strip conflict

Europe
Chad is officially non-aligned but has close relations with France, the former colonial power, which has about 1,200 troops stationed in the capital N'Djamena. It receives economic aid from countries of the European Community, the United States, and various international organizations. Libya supplies aid and has an ambassador resident in N'Djamena. Traditionally strong ties with the Western community have weakened over the past two years due to a dispute between the Government of Chad and the World Bank over how the profits from Chad's petroleum reserves are allocated. Although oil output to the West has resumed and the dispute has officially been resolved, resentment towards what the Déby administration considered foreign meddling lingers.

Oceania

Membership of international organizations
Chad belongs to the following international organizations:

 United Nations and some of its specialized and related agencies
 Organization for African Unity
 Central African Customs and Economic Union (UDEAC)
 African Financial Community (Franc Zone)
 Agency for the Francophone Community
 African, Caribbean and Pacific Group of States
 African Development Bank
 Central African States Development Bank
 Economic and Monetary Union of Central African (CEMAC)
 Economic Commission for Africa; G-77
 International Civil Aviation Organization
 International Red Cross and Red Crescent Movement
 International Development Association
 Islamic Development Bank
 International Fund for Agricultural Development
 International Finance Corporation

 International Federation of the Red Cross and Red Crescent Societies
 International Labour Organization
 International Monetary Fund
 Intelsat
 Interpol
 International Olympic Committee
 International Telecommunication Union
 International Trade Union Confederation
 NAM
 Organisation of Islamic Cooperation
 Organisation for the Prohibition of Chemical Weapons
 Universal Postal Union
 World Confederation of Labour
 World Intellectual Property Organization;
 World Meteorological Organization;
 World Tourism Organization
 World Trade Organization

See also
 List of diplomatic missions in Chad
 List of diplomatic missions of Chad

References